The Lepanto Commercial Historic District encompasses the traditional commercial heart of the small city of Lepanto, Arkansas. The district includes one block of Greenwood Avenue between Berry and Holmes Streets, and portions of two more blocks at either end, as well as two blocks of Berry Street, with a few buildings on adjacent streets. Other early buildings include the triangular  Arlington Light and Power building at 320 Greenwood, and the unusual Barton's of Lepanto building at 111 Berny Street, built as a wood frame lumber yard office ; its walls were bricked in 1955 when it was converted to a hardware store.

The district was listed on the National Register of Historic Places in 2009.

See also
National Register of Historic Places listings in Poinsett County, Arkansas

References

Buildings designated early commercial in the National Register of Historic Places
Art Deco architecture in Arkansas
Buildings and structures completed in 1915
Buildings and structures in Poinsett County, Arkansas
Historic districts on the National Register of Historic Places in Arkansas
National Register of Historic Places in Poinsett County, Arkansas